Tunggul Wulung Airport  is an airport which currently serves the city of Cilacap in Central Java. It is located 9 km from the city downtown. There is a small terminal with the large airport name. The airport has one runway, with dimensions of 1,400 metres (4,593 ft) by 30 metres (98 ft) which allows the operation of aircraft up to ATR 72-600.

Airlines and destinations

References

Tunggul Wulung Airport 

Airports in Central Java